"Under the Water" is a pop song written in 1990 by Owen Bolwell and Stanley Paulzen, produced by Siew for Merril Bainbridge's first album The Garden (1995). The song is about a lover who drowned.

The song was released as the album's second single in July 1995 in Australia and February 1997 in the United States. Although it was successful in Australia, reaching number four on the ARIA Singles Chart. In the United States and Canada, the song peaked at numbers 91 and 72 respectively. At the APRA Music Awards of 1996 it won a trophy for Most Performed Australian Work.

Commercial performance
"Under the Water" had commercial success in Australia. In late July 1995 it debuted at number forty-six on the ARIA Singles Chart. On its fifth week on the chart, it peaked at number four, making the song Bainbridge's second top-ten single. The song spent a total of sixteen weeks in the top fifty and the Australian Recording Industry Association awarded the single a platinum certification for shipping 70,000 copies. It became the twenty-fourth highest selling single in Australia for 1995, selling an estimate of 80,000 copies around Australia. The song was nominated for an ARIA Award as the "Highest Selling Single" for 1996 but lost to "Let's Groove" by CDB.

The song was released in the United States on 18 February 1997 but failed to match the top-ten success of "Mouth", peaking at ninety-one and spending only six weeks on the Billboard Hot 100. It was Bainbridge's last song to date to chart on the Hot 100.

Music video

There were two music videos produced to promote the song, the first one for Australia and a second version for the United States. The original Australian version was a simple black and white video with Bainbridge walking around a forest and performing the song with a band. However, when Bainbridge broke in the U.S. with her previous single "Mouth", a sleeker video, directed by Martin Kahan, was produced for the American market. It was released in December 1996 and showed a man and a woman in a room filled with water.

Track listings
 

Australian CD single
 "Under the Water"
 "Garden in My Room" (demo)
 "Mouth" (demo)

US CD single
 "Under the Water"
 "Mouth" (alternate take)

French CD single
 "Under the Water"
 "Under the Water" (rhythmic version)

Charts

Weekly charts

Year-end charts

Certifications

|}

Release history

References

1995 singles
1995 songs
APRA Award winners
Merril Bainbridge songs